HMS Tempest was an  destroyer of the Royal Navy, built by Fairfield Shipbuilding and Engineering Company at Govan on Clydeside and launched on 26 January 1917 during the First World War.

Design
Tempest was one of twelve  destroyers ordered by the British Admiralty in March 1916 as part of the Eighth War Construction Programme. The ship was launched on 26 January December 1917 and completed in 20 March 1917.

Service
After commissioning, Tempest joined the Tenth Destroyer Flotilla as part of the Harwich Force in April 1917. On 23 April 1918, Tempest participated in the First Ostend Raid, for which she formed part of "Unit X" which sailed from Dover and escorted the blockships from the Goodwin Sands until they reached a smoke screen which had been laid by Motor Launches off Ostend. After that they joined the Dunkirk-based destroyer flotilla in supporting the small craft inshore, "within close range of the enemy's heavy batteries". Tempest remained with the Tenth Flotilla at Harwich until its dispersal in February 1919. In October 1919, she was recommissioned with a reduced complement.

In October 1930, Tempest was used to repatriate the bodies of 48 men who had been killed in the crash of the R101 airship near Beauvais in France. The bodies were carried by Tempest from Boulogne-Sur-Mer to Dover, from where they were taken by rail to lie in state at Westminster Hall.

She was finally sold for scrapping on 28 January 1937 and broken up at Briton Ferry.

References

Bibliography
 
 
 
 

 

1917 ships
R-class destroyers (1916)